Phoenix canariensis, the Canary Island date palm or pineapple palm, is a species of flowering plant in the palm family Arecaceae, native to the Canary Islands off the coast of Morocco. It is a relative of Phoenix dactylifera, the true date palm. It is the natural symbol of the Canary Islands, together with the canary Serinus canaria. Mature P. canariensis are often used in ornamental landscaping and are collected and transplanted to their new planting location.

Description

Names
Common names in English include Canary Island date palm and pineapple palm. The common name in Spanish-speaking countries and in the Canary Islands is palmera canaria.

Cultivation

The Canary Island date palm is typically cultivated in wet-winter or Mediterranean climates,  but also in wet-summer or humid subtropical climates like eastern Australia and the southeastern United States. There are even several instances of cultivated Canary Island date palms in high-latitude oceanic climates, such as Ireland, the UK, and the Channel Islands. It can be cultivated where temperatures rarely fall below  for extended periods, although it will require some protection if cold periods are longer than normal. It is a slowly growing tree, exclusively propagated by seed.

The palm is easily recognized through its crown of leaves and trunk characteristics. It is not uncommon to see Canary Island date palms pruned and trimmed to enhance the appearance. When pruned, the bottom of the crown, also called the nut, appears to have a pineapple shape.

The Canary Island date palm is susceptible to Fusarium wilt, a fungal disease commonly transmitted through contaminated seed, soil, and pruning tools. Spread of the disease can be reduced when pruning tools are disinfected before use on this palm. The South American palm weevil causes them to droop, turn brown and die.
 
It has gained the Royal Horticultural Society's Award of Garden Merit.

Other uses
In the Canary Islands, the sap of this date palm is used to make palm syrup. La Gomera is the only island where the syrup is produced in the Canary Islands.

Invasiveness
In some areas, Phoenix canariensis has proven to be an invasive plant. In Bermuda and the United States (Florida and California) it is considered naturalised (lives wild in a region where it is not indigenous). It has also spread in some areas of peninsular Spain, Portugal, Italy, Australia, and New Zealand. It is listed as invasive (naturalized) in coastal southern California. In Auckland, New Zealand, the palm has itself become a host for the naturalised Australian strangler fig, Ficus macrophylla.

Gallery

See also
 List of animal and plant symbols of the Canary Islands

References

External links

 

canariensis
Endemic flora of the Canary Islands
Garden plants of Europe
Ornamental trees
Drought-tolerant trees
Plants described in 1882